Srilankametrus indus, commonly known as the giant forest scorpion, is a species of scorpions belonging to the family Scorpionidae. It is native to India and Sri Lanka.

Description
This large scorpion has the total length of 90 to 130 mm. Adults are uniformly reddish black to greenish black in color. Both sexes with 10 to 15 pectinal teeth. Pedipalp chela is hirsute, and lobiform. Manus is covered by rounded granules which are appear as rows. Pedipalp patella lacks a pronounced internal tubercle. Carapace smooth, and glossy with some marginal granules. Dorsal and dorsolateral carinae of metasomal segments are smooth. Telson vesicle is longer than aculeus.

A voracious predator, it is known to feed on many larger animals.

References

External links

 Pictures

Scorpionidae
Endemic fauna of India
Endemic fauna of Sri Lanka
Animals described in 1778